Bon-e Gelu (also Romanized as Bon-e Gelū; also known as Boneh-ye Gelū) is a village in Nargesan Rural District, Jebalbarez-e Jonubi District, Anbarabad County, Kerman Province, Iran. At the 2006 census, its population was 340, in 68 families.

References 

Populated places in Anbarabad County